Résidence Lafrance, (transl. Lafrance Residence) is a co-ed dormitory on the campus of the Université de Moncton in Moncton, New Brunswick, Canada. It is named after abbot Xavier-François Lafrance, the first resident priest of the Tracadie parish.

With 160 rooms and 11 floors, it is the largest residence at the university. The building is one of the original structures built for the opening of the university in 1962. At 11 floors, the residence is one of the tallest buildings in Moncton.

See also
 List of tallest buildings in Moncton

References

Université de Moncton
Buildings and structures in Moncton
University and college buildings completed in 1962